Stefano Ianni and Potito Starace won the event the last time it was played, in 2013, but Ianni did not participate. Starace partnered with Adrian Ungur, but they lost to Dino Marcan and Blaž Rola in the first round.

Ilija Bozoljac and Filip Krajinović won the title, defeating Nikoloz Basilashvili and Alexander Bury in the final, 6–1, 6–2.

Seeds

Draw

Draw

References
 Main Draw

Tennis Napoli Cup - Doubles
2015 Doubles